Manoranjan Dhar (21 February 1904 – 22 June 2000) was a Bangladeshi politician and diplomat.

Early life
Dhar obtained his bachelor's from Calcutta University.  He participated in the Non-cooperation movement in 1921. He took part in the Chittagong armoury raid in 1930. He was an editor of the weekly Gana-Abhijan during 1938–1940.

Political career
Dhar was elected a member of the Bengal Legislative Council in 1946 and the East Bengal Legislative Assembly during 1947 – 1958. In 1972, he was appointed the Ambassador of Bangladesh to Japan. He was in charge of the Ministry of Law, Justice and Parliamentary Affairs of Bangladesh on 16 March 1973.

Death 
Dhar died on 22 June 2000.

References

1904 births
2000 deaths
University of Calcutta alumni
Awami League politicians
Ambassadors of Bangladesh to Japan
Law, Justice and Parliamentary Affairs ministers of Bangladesh
Bangladesh Krishak Sramik Awami League executive committee members
Bangladesh Krishak Sramik Awami League central committee members